Carlisle Island is an island in the Islands of Four Mountains subgroup of the Aleutian archipelago.

References

External links

Islands of Four Mountains
Islands of Alaska
Islands of Unorganized Borough, Alaska